Hayang is a town, or eup in Gyeongsan, North Gyeongsang Province, South Korea. The township Hayang-myeon was upgraded to the town Hayang-eup in 1973. Hayang Town Office is located in Geumnak-ri, which is crowded with people.

Communities
Hayang-eup is divided into 16 villages (ri).

References

External links
Official website 

Gyeongsan
Towns and townships in North Gyeongsang Province